Jamesoniella colorata is a species of liverwort in the Jungermanniaceae family. It is found in the zone of the Antarctic Convergence. Samples have been found on the Kerguelen islands, Crozet islands, and the Prince Edward islands.

History of discovery
Johann Georg Christian Lehmann originally described the species in 1829 as Jungermannia colorata. then in 1893 Schiffn. moved the species to the genus Jamesoniella. Kaalaas described what he thought was a new species in 1911, but which was later reduced to a synonym of Jamesoniella colorata by Grolle in 1971.

Literature
 Kaalaas B. 1911. "Bryophyten aus den Crozetinseln. I. Nyt Magazin Naturvidenskaberne (Kristiania) 49: 81-89

Sources
 

Jungermanniales
Flora of the Kerguelen Islands
Flora of the Crozet Islands
Flora of the Prince Edward Islands